This is a list of people from Stockport, in North West England. The demonym of Stockport is Stopfordian, however, this list may include people from Bredbury, Cheadle, Cheadle Hulme, Marple, Reddish and Romiley, all from the wider Metropolitan Borough of Stockport. This list is arranged alphabetically by surname.


A
John Amaechi (born 1970), English psychologist, consultant and retired basketball player.
Nathan Aspinall (born 15 July 1991) is an English darts player currently playing in Professional Darts Corporation events

B
 George Back (1796–1878), British Royal Navy officer, Arctic explorer, naturalist and artist. 
 Joan Bakewell (born 1933), TV presenter, newsreader and journalist
 Peter Barkworth (1929–2006), actor; born in Margate, moved to Bramhall as a child
 James Johnson Battersby (1875–1949), hat manufacturer, Battersby Hats,  survivor
 Norman Beaker (born 1950), British blues artist; official inductee as British Legend in Blues Hall of Fame Born in Longsight, Manchester, he resides in Stockport.
 Melanie Blake, talent agent and author
 Peter Boardman (1950–1982), mountaineer who died on Everest North-East Ridge; born in Bramhall; attended Stockport Grammar
 John Bradshaw (1602–1659), English jurist notable for his role as President of the High Court of Justice for the trial and regicide of King Charles I 
 Liam Broady (born 1994), 2010 Wimbledon Boys' Doubles champion; born in Manchester, now lives in Stockport
 Andrew Buchan (born 1979), TV and stage actor; born in Stockport and brought up in the Bolton suburb of Lostock
Peter Butterworth (1917–1978), film actor, known for appearances in Carry On films
Paul Burgess (born 1950), Drummer notable for his association with a wide range of bands and artists such as 10cc, Jethro Tull, Camel, Magna Carta and The Icicle Works.

C
Nick Cohen, journalist.
James Conway (1922–1942), Royal Navy marine; born in Edgeley; shot on Cockleshell Heroes commando raid
Craig Cash, comedy writer and actor, Dave in The Royle Family born and raised in Heaton Norris

D
Tess Daly (born 1969), English model and television presenter, known for co-presenting the BBC One celebrity talent show Strictly Come Dancing
Karl Davies (born 1982), English film and television actor
Josh Dewhurst, Lead guitarist for the band Blossoms
Sacha Dhawan (born 1984), English actor, stage, film, television and radio; born in Bramhall, Stockport
David Dickinson, born David Gulessarian (born 1941), antiques expert and television presenter
Joe Donovan, Drummer for the band Blossoms.

E
Paul Eastham, singer-songwriter and musician of Celtic rock band Coast
Alex Etel (born 1994), English actor known for Millions and The Water Horse
Yasmin Evans (born 1990), English radio DJ and TV presenter known for presenting on BBC Radio 1Xtra

F
Yvette Fielding (born 1968), actress and television presenter
Tibor Fischer (born 1959), novelist and short story writer nominated for the Booker prize
Darryl Fitton (born 1962), English professional darts player currently playing in British Darts Organisation events.
Phil Foden (born 2000) is an English professional footballer who plays as a midfielder for Premier League club Manchester City
Norman Foster (born 1935), Stockport-born architect; made Baron Foster of Thames Bank, Reddish, in 1999; brought up in Levenshulme, Manchester, which borders Heaton Chapel, Stockport
Claire Foy (born 1984), Emmy Award-winning actress, known for her role as Queen Elizabeth II in the Netflix series The Crown.
Nicholas Frankau (b 1968), English actor known for the role of Lt. Carstairs in the British sitcom 'Allo 'Allo!
Martin Fry (born 1958), lead singer of the English new wave band ABC; born in Stretford, moved to Bramhall as a child
Hughie Fury (born 1994), British professional boxer who fights at heavyweight.

G
William Garbutt (1883–1964), football player and manager called "the most important man in the history of Italian football" by Vittorio Pozzo
Sidney Gilliat (1908–1994), film director, producer and writer, The Lady Vanishes, Jamaica Inn
James Goddard (born 1983), swimmer, grew up in Stockport

H
 Louise Hampton (1879–1954), stage, film and television actress
Sarah Harding (born 1981- 2021), of pop group Girls Aloud
Nigel Harrison (born 1951), of the American rock band Blondie during the 1970s and 1980s.
 Matthew Hatton (born 1981), professional boxer
Ricky Hatton (born 1978), professional boxer; light welterweight world champion
Geoffrey Hayes (1942–2018), English television presenter and actor
James Hickman (born 1976), 5 times world champion swimmer; TV producer
Wendy Hiller (1912–2003), film and stage actress
Gerard Horan (born 1962), actor, Leslie "Charisma" Appleby in London's Burning, 1988–1989 and 1994
William Houldsworth, industrialist and politician; born in Manchester; built Houldsworth Mill, the surrounding housing and St Elizabeth's Church in Reddish
Dominic Howard (born 1977), Stockport-born drummer of the alternative rock band Muse

I
 Tom Ince (born 1992), English footballer who plays for EFL Championship club Luton Town on loan from Stoke City; son of former England captain Paul Ince

J
Paul Jackson (born 1947), television director, producer and executive
Owen Jones, journalist
Barb Jungr, singer, songwriter and musician

K
Arthur Kadmon, guitarist with post-punk bands from Manchester, including Ludus and the Fall
Michael Keane, professional football player playing for Everton F.C., twin brother of Will
Will Keane, professional football player playing for Wigan Athletic, twin brother of Michael
Michelle Keegan, actress, played Tina McIntyre in Coronation Street
Myles Kellock, Keyboardist and backing vocalist for the band Blossoms.

L
Horace Lamb, FRS (1849–1934), applied mathematician and technical author
Bronte Law (born 1995), Professional golfer.
Adam Le Fondre (born 1986), English professional footballer 
Sally Lindsay (born 1973), actress, Shelley Unwin in Coronation Street
Alan Lowndes (1921–1978), painter

M
Jason Manford (born 1981), comedian, television presenter and actor, known for roles on comedy panel shows such as 8 Out of 10 Cats and Odd One Out.
John Mayall British Blues pioneer, born and raised in Cheadle 
Mark McGeeney (born 1972), English darts player.
Wayne McGregor (born 1970), multi award-winning British choreographer and director
Tim McInnerny (born 1956), actor; born and brought up in Cheadle Hulme; known for his roles as Lord Percy and Captain Darling in Blackadder
Tyrone Mears (born 1983), English-Sierra Leonean footballer who plays with Seattle Sounders FC
Will Mellor (born 1976) actor, known as Gaz in Two Pints of Lager
Danny Miller (born 1991) actor, known for playing Aaron Livesy in Emmerdale
Dominic Monaghan (born 1976), film actor known for his role as Merry Brandybuck in The Lord of the Rings
Sir John Voce Moore (1826–1904), Lord Mayor of London, 1898
Roger Moorhouse (born 1968), Stockport-born historian and author
Carol Morley (born 1966), English film director, screenwriter and producer
Paul Morley (born 1957), music journalist, musician, producer and founder of record label ZTT
Alan Morrissey (born 1982), actor; born and brought up in Stockport; known for his role of Nicky Van Barr in Holby City, alongside a theatre career

O
Tom Ogden, lead singer of the band Blossoms.
Tony O'Shea (born 1961) English darts player who competes in British Darts Organisation events.

P
Fred Perry (1909–1995), former World No.1 tennis player and Wimbledon Champion; born in Portwood and granted the freedom of Stockport in 1934
Samuel Perry (1877–1954), MP for Kettering; father of Fred Perry
Christopher Priest (novelist) (born 1943), British novelist and science fiction writer.

R
Fred Ridgway (1923–2015), first-class cricketer; played for Kent; represented England in five Test matches; born in Stockport.
Angela Rayner (born 1980), British Labour politician and current Deputy Leader of the Labour Party.

S
Charlie Salt, bassist and backing vocalist for the band Blossoms
Daz Sampson (born 1974), music/television producer; 2006 UK Eurovision Song Contest contestant
Chris Sanders (b 1998), first-class cricketer
 Sir Edmund Shaa (died 1488), Lord Mayor of London, 1482 and founder of Stockport Grammar School. Born in Mottram.
Darren Shahlavi (1972–2015), English actor, martial artist and stuntman
Samantha Siddall (born 1982), Reddish-born actress known for playing Mandy Maguire in Shameless
Richard Sykes (1839–1923), rugby player who helped found two major clubs; landowner in North Dakota, USA; founded five towns there, one named after his birthplace of Edgeley

T
Steve Thomas (born 1963), retired ice hockey right winger; born in Stockport; played 20 seasons in the NHL for the Toronto Maple Leafs, Chicago Blackhawks, New York Islanders, New Jersey Devils, Mighty Ducks of Anaheim and Detroit Red Wings
Maurice Tremlett (1923–1984), first-class cricketer; played for Somerset; represented England in three Test matches; born in Stockport

W
Matthew Walker (born 1978), swimmer who has participated in four Paralympic Games, winning eleven medals; competes in the S7 (butterfly and freestyle), SM7 (medley) and SB7 (breaststroke) classifications
Paul Warhurst (born 1969), Stockport-born footballer who played for many clubs, including Blackburn Rovers, Bolton Wanderers, Oldham Athletic, and Sheffield Wednesday
Joanne Whalley (Joanne Whalley-Kilmer) (born 1961), actress; born in Salford; grew up in Stockport
Hannah Whelan (born 1992), gymnast who represented the United Kingdom at the 2008 Summer Olympics; lives and trains in Stockport
Sir Joseph Whitworth (1803–1887), Victorian engineer who has given his name to many Manchester buildings and streets; born in Stockport
Marty Willson-Piper (born 1958), singer, songwriter, guitarist. Former longtime member of Australian band The Church and UK band All About Eve. Plays guitar in Swedish band Anekdoten and in the US with HuDost and Acres of Space.
Rick Witter (born 1972), Stockport-born singer, songwriter and frontman of the York-based rock band Shed Seven
Kaye Wragg (born 1972), The Bill and Holby City actress.

Y
Mike Yarwood, impressionist born in Bredbury

See also 
List of people from Greater Manchester

References 
Notes

 
Stockport
Stockport